At the 1993 East Asian Games, the athletics events were held at the Yuanshen Sports Centre Stadium in Shanghai, People's Republic of China. A total of 41 events were contested, of which 22 by male and 19 by female athletes. The competition featured only track and field events as there was no marathon race and the 20 km walk was held on the track.

The host country, China, dominated the proceedings by winning the most gold medals and having the highest overall total. Chinese athletes won 29 of the 41 events, and won all of the women's competitions except two sprinting events. Japan was a clear second with a total of 29 medals, while South Korea was the third-most successful nation. All the countries at the Games won at least one medal in the athletics competition, with the sole exception of Macau.

Wang Huei-Chen, representing Chinese Taipei, was the only woman to upset the Chinese hegemony and she won the gold in both the 100 metres and 200 metres events. Qu Yunxia won the 1500 metres – an event that she went on to set a long-standing world record in at the 1993 Chinese National Games. The hammer throw saw 18-year-old Koji Murofushi (later an Olympic champion) reach his first international podium, winning a bronze medal. Zhang Lirong became the first and only women's 3000 metres champion of the Games as the event was replaced with the 5000 metres in 1997. Three athletes reached the podium in two individual events: Li Yong-Ae of North Korea won silver medals in the long and triple jump, her teammate Choi Ok-Soon was the 800 m and 1500 m bronze medallist, and Lee Myung-Sun won the javelin silver and shot put bronze.

A number of athletes went on to further success at the 1994 Asian Games: among the men's East Asian Games gold medallists, Lee Jin-Il, Shunji Karube, Takahisa Yoshida, Bi Zhong and Zhang Lianbiao also became the Asian champion in their event. On the women's side, Wang Huei-Chen, Qu Yunxia and Min Chunfeng went on to add the 1994 Asian gold to their East Asian titles.

Medal summary

Men

Women

Medal table

See also
1993 in athletics (track and field)

References

External links
Olympic Council of Asia website

1993 East Asian Games
1993
East Asian Games
1993 East Asian Games